Montana is an unincorporated community located in Harmony Township, in Warren County, New Jersey, United States.

History
A post office called Montana was established in 1867, and remained in operation until 1904. The community was named after the Montana Territory.

References

Harmony Township, New Jersey
Unincorporated communities in Warren County, New Jersey
Unincorporated communities in New Jersey